The Sommerfeld parameter , named after Arnold Sommerfeld, is a dimensionless quantity used in nuclear astrophysics in the calculation of reaction rates between two nuclei and also appears in the definition of the astrophysical S-factor. It is defined as

,

One of its best-known applications is in the exponent of the Gamow factor  (also known as the penetrability factor),

,

which is the probability of an s-wave nuclide to penetrate the Coulomb barrier, according to the WKB approximation. This factor is particularly helpful in characterizing the nuclear contribution to low-energy nucleon-scattering cross-sections - namely, through the astrophysical S-factor.

One of the first articles in which the Sommerfeld parameter appeared was published in 1967.

References 

Nuclear physics
Astrophysics